Deuterotinea stschetkini is a moth in the Eriocottidae family. It was described by Zagulajev in 1972. It is found in Turkmenistan and Tajikistan.

References

Moths described in 1972
Eriocottidae
Insects of Central Asia